The Battle of Huanta was a battle that took place between Peruvian and Royalist forces from Iquicha fighting in the name of Ferdinand VII in the town of Huanta during the Iquicha War of 1825–1828.

Background
A first revolt of the indigenous people of the region had been put down with great violence by Marshal Andrés de Santa Cruz, with executions without trial of prisoners, confiscations of cattle, burning of towns and all kinds of violence against civilians, leaving a great resentment among the locals. After rising again to restore the Spanish monarchy in October 1827, the indigenous people of the punas near Huanta marched in the city. According to subsequent statements by the Spanish prisoner Manuel Gato, who was interrogated by the Peruvian army, under the orders of Brigadier General Antonio Huachaca, 500 residents of the town and 1,000 Indians from the highlands participated in this march.

Battle
The Iquichans occupied the heights that dominate the town in the first days of November, in the staggered section between the Mio and Culluchaca hills, two or three leagues from the town. They were organized into battalions headed by the brigadier's lieutenants, Lanchi Curo, Tadeo Chocce (or Choque), Prudencio Huachaca, Sergeant Major Pedro Cárdenas, Santiago Méndez, and numerous indigenous regional commanders who operated guerrillas selected by towns, communities, and hamlets under their command. They were armed with rifles, rejones and slingshots, with barely five Spanish officers in their ranks.

Finally, at dawn on November 12, the rebels attacked the town from various directions to encircle the garrison. The defenders, some 175 soldiers from the Pichincha battalion, were entrenched in the local town hall under the command of Sergeant Major Narciso Tudela. The small force went out to meet the assailants, but after a weak resistance in the central streets of the town they had to flee to the main church of the town, where they were persecuted and locked up all day, being able to escape only at nightfall. The rebels lost 60 men in the fight, while their enemies 10 to 12; another 80 to 90 republican soldiers managed to flee to Ayacucho in small groups.

Aftermath
Although most of the neighbors stayed, many preferred to flee to Ayacucho. There was no looting except for a few public buildings, but the main barracks were burned to the ground. Many republican soldiers sought refuge in the temples, but were still subjected to trials for their previous acts. The comuneros (Indians from rural communities) executed those who acted cruelly in the previous repression.

Huachaca organized the population to repair bridges and roads, regulate public order and collect tithes. On the 22nd to 24th of that month there were negotiations between both sides but they did not lead to anything. After this, the brigadier decided to advance to Ayacucho.

References

Bibliography
 
 
 
 
 
 

Battles of the Peruvian War of Independence
Conflicts in 1827
History of Ayacucho Region